Tim Reyes (born June 9, 1982) is an American professional surfer. He is competing on the ASP World Tour.

Reyes began his elite tour campaign in 2005. The 2009 season is his 5th season on tour. His highest ASP World Tour rating was 11th in 2006.

As of 2009 his total career earnings are  $310,850.00.

Early life
Timothy Charles Reyes Jr. was born June 9, 1982 in West Covina, Los Angeles County, California to Timothy Charles Reyes Sr. and Julie Hébert.  He has a younger sister, Michelle. He began his surfing competitions at age 12 in his own backyard river jetties.  At age 13, he was featured in Surfer Magazine for the first time.  He graduated from Edison High School in Huntington Beach, California.

Rating history on the ASP World Tour
2008: 16th
2007: 46th
2006: 11th
2005: 31st

References

ASP World Tour page

American surfers
1982 births
Living people